The 1997 Boston Red Sox season was the 97th season in the franchise's Major League Baseball history. The Red Sox finished fourth in the American League East with a record of 78 wins and 84 losses, 20 games behind the Baltimore Orioles. It was the last time the Red Sox had a losing record until 2012. The Red Sox had 5,781 at bats, a single-season major league record.

Offseason 
 December 9, 1996: Bret Saberhagen was signed as a free agent with the Boston Red Sox.
 January 22, 1997: Steve Avery was signed as a free agent with the Boston Red Sox.
 January 27, 1997: José Canseco was traded by the Boston Red Sox to the Oakland Athletics for John Wasdin and cash.
 January 31, 1997: Mike Benjamin was signed as a free agent with the Boston Red Sox.

Regular season

Season standings

Record vs. opponents

Notable Transactions 
 July 31, 1997: Heathcliff Slocumb was traded by the Boston Red Sox to the Seattle Mariners for Derek Lowe and Jason Varitek.
 August 30, 1997: Curtis Pride was signed as a free agent with the Boston Red Sox.

Opening Day Line Up

Roster

Wally the Green Monster 

Wally the Green Monster is the official mascot for the Boston Red Sox. His name is derived from the Green Monster nickname of the 37-foot wall in left field at Fenway Park. Wally debuted in 1997 to the chagrin of many older Red Sox fans. Although he was a hit with children, the older fans did not immediately adopt him as part of the franchise.
According to the Red Sox promotions department, Wally was a huge Red Sox fan who decided to move inside the left field wall of Fenway Park since it "eats up" hits that would easily be home runs at other parks in 1947. Apparently, he was very shy and lived the life of a hermit for 50 years. On the 50th anniversary of the Green Monster in 1997, he came out of the manual scoreboard and has been interacting with players and fans ever since. Thanks to former Red Sox second baseman and current broadcaster Jerry Remy, those older fans have adored him.

Player stats

Batting

Starters by position 
Note: Position; G = Games played; AB = At bats; H = Hits; Avg. = Batting average; HR = Home runs; RBI = Runs batted in; SB = Stolen bases

Other batters 
Note: G = Games played; AB = At bats; H = Hits; Avg. = Batting average; HR = Home runs; RBI = Runs batted in; SB = Stolen bases

Pitching 
Note: G = Games pitched; GS = Games started; IP = Innings pitched; W = Wins; L = Losses; SV = Saves; ERA = Earned run average; SO = Strikeouts

Starting pitchers

Main relief pitchers 
Note: G = Games pitched; GS = Games started; IP = Innings pitched; W = Wins; L = Losses; SV = Saves; ERA = Earned run average; SO = Strikeouts

Other pitchers and secondary relief pitchers 
Note: G = Games pitched; GS = Games started; IP = Innings pitched; W = Wins; L = Losses; SV = Saves; ERA = Earned run average; SO = Strikeouts

Game log 

|- style="text-align:center; background-color:#bfb;"
| 1 || April 2 || @ Angels  || 6–5 || Mahomes (1–0) || Percival (0–1) || Slocumb (1) || Anaheim Stadium || 30,874 || 1–0 || W1
|- style="text-align:center; background-color:#fbb;"
| 2 || April 3 || @ Angels  || 0–2 || Dickson (1–0) || Wakefield (0–1) || — || Anaheim Stadium || 17,323  || 1–1 || L1
|- style="text-align:center; background-color:#bfb;"
| 3 || April 4 || @ Mariners  || 10–5 || Sele (1–0)  || Wolcott (0–1) || Henry (1) || Kingdome || 40,716 || 2–1 || W1
|- style="text-align:center; background-color:#bfb;"
| 4 || April 5 || @ Mariners  || 8–6 || Trlicek (1–0)  || Charlton (0–1)  || Slocumb (2) || Kingdome || 57,110 || 3–1 || W2
|- style="text-align:center; background-color:#fbb;"
| 5 || April 6 || @ Mariners || 7–8 (10)|| Charlton (1–1) || Trlicek (1–1) || — || Kingdome || 33,450 || 3–2 || L1
|- style="text-align:center; background-color:#fbb;"
| 6 || April 7 || @ Athletics  || 2–6 || Lewis (2–0) || Gordon (0–1) || Taylor (4) || Oakland-Alameda County Coliseum || 8,482 || 3–3 || L2
|- style="text-align:center; background-color:#bfb;"
| 7 || April 8 || @ Athletics  || 13–7  || Trlicek (2–1) || Wengert (0–2) || Henry (2) || Oakland-Alameda County Coliseum || 9,010 || 4–3 || W1
|- style="text-align:center; background-color:#fbb"
| 8 || April 9 || @ Athletics || 3–4 (10)|| Small (1–0) || Trlicek (2–2) || — || Oakland-Alameda County Coliseum || 11,057 || 4–4 || L1
|- style="text-align:center; background-color:#fbb"
| 9 || April 11 || Mariners || 3–5 || Johnson (1–0) || Avery (0–1) || Charlton (2) || Fenway Park || 34,210 || 4–5 || L2
|- style="text-align:center; background-color:#fbb"
| 10 || April 12 || Mariners || 1–5 (10)|| Fassero (2–0) || Corsi (0–1) || — || Fenway Park || 15,358 || 4–6 || L3
|- style="text-align:center; background-color:#bfb"
| 11 || April 13 || Mariners || 7–1 || Gordon (1–1) || Sanders (0–3) || — || Fenway Park || 30,300 || 5–6 || W1
|- style="text-align:center; background-color:#bfb"
| 12 || April 14 || Athletics || 10–1 || Wakefield (1–1) || Adams (0–1) || — || Fenway Park || 18,166 || 6–6 || W2
|- style="text-align:center; background-color:#bfb"
| 13 || April 15 || Athletics || 7–2 || Sele (2–0) || Karsay (0–1) || — || Fenway Park || 17,862 || 7–6 || W3
|- style="text-align:center; background-color:#bfb"
| 14 || April 16 || Indians || 11–6 || Avery (1–1) || Ogea (2–1) || — || Fenway Park || 21,305 || 8–6 || W4
|- style="text-align:center; background-color:#fbb;"
| 15 || April 17 || Indians || 3–4 || Kline (3–0) || Trlicek (2–3) || Mesa (1) || Fenway Park || 17,988 || 8–7 || L1
|- style="text-align:center; background-color:#bbb"
| — || April 18 || Orioles  || colspan=8|Postponed (rain). Makeup date June 10.
|- style="text-align:center; background-color:#bbb"
| — || April 19 || Orioles  || colspan=8|Postponed (rain). Makeup date June 12.
|- style="text-align:center; background-color:#fbb;"
| 16 || April 20 || Orioles || 1–11 || Key (3–0) || Gordon (1–2) || — || Fenway Park || 32,290 || 8–8 || L2
|- style="text-align:center; background-color:#bfb;"
| 17 || April 21 || Orioles || 4–2 || Sele (3–0) || Erickson (2–1) || Slocumb (3) || Fenway Park || 33,608 || 9–8 || W1
|- style="text-align:center; background-color:#bfb;"
| 18 || April 22 || @ Indians || 8–2 || Avery (2–1) || Ogea (2–2) || Henry (3) || Jacobs Field || 41,800 || 10–8 || W2
|- style="text-align:center; background-color:#fbb;"
| 19 || April 23 || @ Indians  || 7–11 || McDowell (1–2) || Trlicek (2–4) || — || Jacobs Field || 42,430 || 10–9 || L1
|- style="text-align:center; background-color:#bfb;"
| 20 || April 24 || @ Orioles || 2–1 (12)|| Trlicek (3–4) || Mathews (0–1) || Henry (4) || Camden Yards || 40,000 || 11–9 || W1
|- style="text-align:center; background-color:#fbb;"
| 21 || April 25 || @ Orioles  || 0–2 || Erickson (3–1) || Gordon (1–3) || Myers (9) || Camden Yards || 45,227 || 11–10 || L1
|- style="text-align:center; background-color:#fbb;"
| 22 || April 26 || @ Orioles  || 5–14 || Key (4–0) || Sele (3–1) || Johnson (1) || Camden Yards || 47,727 || 11–11 || L2
|- style="text-align:center; background-color:#bfb;"
| 23 || April 27 || @ Orioles  || 13–7 || Henry (1–0) || Rhodes (2–1) || — || Camden Yards || 47,307 || 12–11 || W1
|- style="text-align:center; background-color:#fbb;"
| 24 || April 29 || Angels  || 4–5 || Holtz (2–0) || Henry (1–1) || James (2) || Fenway Park || 19,347 || 12–12 || L1
|- style="text-align:center; background-color:#bfb;"
| 25 || April 30 || Angels  || 11–2 || Hammond (1–0) || Dickson (4–1) || — || Fenway Park || 20,322 || 13–12 || W1
|-

|- style="text-align:center; background-color:#bbb"
| — || May 1 || Angels  || colspan=8|Postponed (rain). Makeup date July 25.
|- style="text-align:center; background-color:#bfb"
| 26 || May 2 || @ Rangers || 5–4 || Henry (2–1) || Patterson (2–3) || Slocumb (4) || The Ballpark in Arlington || 35,338 || 14–12 || W2
|- style="text-align:center; background-color:#fbb"
| 27 || May 3 || @ Rangers || 6–7 || Vosberg (1–1) || Slocumb (0–1) || — || The Ballpark in Arlington || 43,577 || 14–13 || L1 
|- style="text-align:center; background-color:#fbb;"
| 28 || May 4 || @ Rangers || 6–7 || Patterson (3–3) || Henry (2–2) || Wetteland (7) || The Ballpark in Arlington || 37,294 || 14–14 || L2 
|- style="text-align:center; background-color:#fbb;"
| 29 || May 5 || Royals || 0–2 || Appier (4–1) || Hammond (1–1) || — || Fenway Park || 19,061 || 14–15 || L3
|- style="text-align:center; background-color:#fbb;"
| 30 || May 6 || Royals || 2–7 || Rosado (3–0) || Gordon (1–4) || Pichardo (5) || Fenway Park || 20,178 || 14–16 || L4 
|- style="text-align:center; background-color:#bfb;"
| 31 || May 7 || Twins || 11–3 || Sele (4–1) || Radke (2–2) || — || Fenway Park || 19,075 || 15–16 || W1 
|- style="text-align:center; background-color:#fbb;"
| 32 || May 8 || Twins || 7–10 || Robertson (3–1) || Garcés (0–1) || Aguilera (6) || Fenway Park || 24,959 || 15–17 || L1 
|- style="text-align:center; background-color:#fbb;"
| 33 || May 9 || Rangers || 1–5 || Witt (6–0) || Wasdin (0–1) || — || Fenway Park || 23,514 || 15–18 || L2 
|- style="text-align:center; background-color:#fbb;"
| 34 || May 10 || Rangers || 5–11 || Patterson (4–3) || Slocumb (0–2) || — || Fenway Park || 25,084 || 15–19 || L3
|- style="text-align:center; background-color:#fbb;"
| 35 || May 11 || Rangers || 6–8 || Santana (1–0) || Gordon (1–5) || Wetteland (8) || Fenway Park || 27,025 || 15–20 || L4 
|- style="text-align:center; background-color:#fbb;"
| 36 || May 13 || @ Royals || 9–0 || Belcher (5–3) || Sele (4–2) || — || Kauffman Stadium || 13,035 || 15–21 || L5 
|- style="text-align:center; background-color:#fbb;"
| 37 || May 14 || @ Royals || 2–6 || Veres (3–0) || Wakefield (1–2) || Pichardo (6) || Kauffman Stadium || 13,254 || 15–22 || L6 
|- style="text-align:center; background-color:#fbb"
| 38 || May 16 || @ Twins || 5–11 || Aldred (2–5) || Hammond (1–2) || — || Metrodome || 15,311 || 15–23 || L7 
|- style="text-align:center; background-color:#bfb"
| 39 || May 17 || @ Twins || 4–0 || Gordon (2–5) || Radke (2–2) || — || Metrodome || 18,388 || 16–23 || W1 
|- style="text-align:center; background-color:#fbb"
| 40 || May 18 || @ Twins || 5–7 || Robertson (4–2) || Sele (4–3) || Aguilera (7) || Metrodome || 13,879 || 16–24 || L1 
|- style="text-align:center; background-color:#fbb"
| 41 || May 20 || @ White Sox || 1–10 || Navarro (4–2) || Wakefield (1–3) || — || Comiskey Park || 16,563 || 16–25 || L2 
|- style="text-align:center; background-color:#fbb"
| 42 || May 21 || @ White Sox || 5–10 || Drabek (3–3) || Hammond (1–3) || — || Comiskey Park || 18,814 || 16–26 || L3
|- style="text-align:center; background-color:#bfb"
| 43 || May 22 || @ Yankees || 8–2 || Gordon (3–5) || Wells (4–3) || — || Yankee Stadium || 28,255 || 17–26 || W1
|- style="text-align:center; background-color:#bfb"
| 44 || May 23 || @ Yankees || 9–3 || Sele (5–3) || Nelson (1–4) || — || Yankee Stadium || 29,003 || 18–26 || W2 
|- style="text-align:center; background-color:#fbb;"
| 45 || May 24 || @ Yankees || 2–4 || Rivera (1–1) || Wasdin (0–2) || — || Yankee Stadium || 44,094 || 18–27 || L1 
|- style="text-align:center; background-color:#bbb"
| — || May 25 || @ Yankees  || colspan=8|Postponed (rain). Makeup date September 16.
|- style="text-align:center; background-color:#bfb;"
| 46 || May 26 || Brewers || 3–2 || Hammond (2–3) || Jones (3–1) || — || Fenway Park || 28,438 || 19–27 || W1 
|- style="text-align:center; background-color:#bfb;"
| 47 || May 27 || Brewers || 7–6 || Corsi (1–1) || Adamson (1–1) || Slocumb (5) || Fenway Park || 24,396 || 20–27 || W2 
|- style="text-align:center; background-color:#bfb"
| 48 || May 28 || White Sox || 5–3 || Sele (6–3) || Álvarez (3–6) || Slocumb (6) || Fenway Park || 28,078 || 21–27 || W3 
|- style="text-align:center; background-color:#fbb"
| 49 || May 29 || White Sox || 2–5 (11)|| Hernández (3–1) || Wasdin (0–3) || Simas (1) || Fenway Park || 27,775 || 21–28 || L1 
|- style="text-align:center; background-color:#bfb"
| 50 || May 30 || Yankees || 10–4 || Hammond (3–3) || Mendoza (3–2) || — || Fenway Park || 32,341 || 22–28 || W1 
|- style="text-align:center; background-color:#fbb"
| 51 || May 31 || Yankees || 2–7 || Pettitte (7–3) || Wakefield (1–4) || — || Fenway Park || 55,191 || 22–29 || L1 
|-

|- style="text-align:center; background-color:#fbb;"
| 52 || June 1 || Yankees || 6–11 (15)|| Nelson (2–4) || Lacy (0–1) || — || Fenway Park || 31,798 || 22–30 || L2 
|- style="text-align:center; background-color:#fbb;"
| 53 || June 2 || Yankees || 2–5 || Wells (6–3) || Sele (6–4) || Rivera (16) || Fenway Park || 31,329 || 22–31 || L3
|- style="text-align:center; background-color:#fbb;"
| 54 || June 3 || @ Brewers || 4–6 || Wickman (3–2) || Slocumb (0–3) || — || Milwaukee County Stadium || 16,139 || 22–32 || L4
|- style="text-align:center; background-color:#fbb"
| 55 || June 4 || @ Brewers || 11–13 || Eldred (6–5) || Brandenburg (0–1) || Jones (14) || Milwaukee County Stadium || 13,089 || 22–33 || L5
|- style="text-align:center; background-color:#bfb"
| 56 || June 5 || @ Brewers || 2–1 || Wakefield (2–4) || McDonald (6–4) || Lacy (1) || Milwaukee County Stadium || 13,196 || 23–33 || W1 
|- style="text-align:center; background-color:#fbb"
| 57 || June 6 || Indians || 3–7 || Hershiser (6–2) || Gordon (3–6) || — || Fenway Park || 30,202 || 23–34 || L1 
|- style="text-align:center; background-color:#fbb"
| 58 || June 7 || Indians || 5–9 || Colón (1–2) || Sele (6–5) || — || Fenway Park || 32,780 || 23–35 || L2
|- style="text-align:center; background-color:#bfb"
| 59 || June 8 || Indians || 12–6 || Hudson (1–0) || Ogea (5–5) || — || Fenway Park || 32,155 || 24–35 || W1 
|- style="text-align:center; background-color:#fbb"
| 60 || June 10 (1)|| Orioles || 2–7 || Erickson (9–2) || Eshelman (0–1) || — || Fenway Park || — || 24–36 || L1
|- style="text-align:center; background-color:#fbb;"
| 61 || June 10 (2)|| Orioles || 2–4 || Rhodes (3–2) || Wakefield (2–5) || Myers (20) || Fenway Park || 30,995 || 24–37 || L2
|- style="text-align:center; background-color:#bfb;"
| 62 || June 11 || Orioles || 10–1 || Gordon (4–6) || Johnson (0–1) || — || Fenway Park || 26,479 || 25–37 || W1
|- style="text-align:center; background-color:#bfb;"
| 63 || June 12 || Orioles || 9–5 || Sele (7–5) || Kamieniecki (4–3) || — || Fenway Park || 24,970 || 26–37 || W2
|- style="text-align:center; background-color:#bfb;"
| 64 || June 13 || @ Mets || 8–4 || Suppan (1–0) || Reed (4–4) || Lacy (2) || Shea Stadium || 44,443 || 27–37 || W3 
|- style="text-align:center; background-color:#fbb;"
| 65 || June 14 || @ Mets || 2–5 || Clark (6–4) || Wakefield (2–6) || Franco (17) || Shea Stadium || 35,456 || 27–38 || L1
|- style="text-align:center; background-color:#bfb;"
| 66 || June 15 || @ Mets || 10–1 || Eshelman (1–1) || Jones (11–3) || — || Shea Stadium || 23,557 || 28–38 || W1
|- style="text-align:center; background-color:#bfb;"
| 67 || June 16 || Phillies || 5–4 (10)|| Wasdin (1–3) || Bottalico (1–3) || — || Fenway Park || 26,926 || 29–38 || W2
|- style="text-align:center; background-color:#bfb;"
| 68 || June 17 || Phillies || 12–6 || Sele (8–5) || Ruffcorn (0–1) || Lacy (3) || Fenway Park || 25,591 || 30–38 || W3 
|- style="text-align:center; background-color:#bfb;"
| 69 || June 18 || Phillies || 4–2 || Suppan (2–0) || Schilling (8–6) || Hammond (1) || Fenway Park || 27,502 || 31–38 || W4
|- style="text-align:center; background-color:#fbb;"
| 70 || June 20 || @ Tigers || 6–12 || Thompson (7–5) || Wakefield (2–7) || Sager (3) || Tiger Stadium || 20,091 || 31–39 || L1
|- style="text-align:center; background-color:#fbb"
| 71 || June 21 || @ Tigers || 4–15 || Bautista (1–1) || Eshelman (1–2) || — || Tiger Stadium || 20,559 || 31–40 || L2
|- style="text-align:center; background-color:#bfb"
| 72 || June 22 || @ Tigers || 2–1 || Gordon (5–6) || Blair (4–4) || Slocumb (7) || Tiger Stadium || 19,477 || 32–40 || W1 
|- style="text-align:center; background-color:#bfb"
| 73 || June 23 || @ Blue Jays || 7–6 || Sele (9–5) || Williams (2–7) || Slocumb (8) || SkyDome || 30,380 || 33–40 || W2
|- style="text-align:center; background-color:#bfb"
| 74 || June 24 || @ Blue Jays || 9–6 || Wasdin (2–3) || Andújar (0–4) || Slocumb (9) || SkyDome || 27,263 || 34–40 || W3
|- style="text-align:center; background-color:#bfb"
| 75 || June 25 || @ Blue Jays || 13–12 || Wakefield (3–7) || Hentgen (8–4) || Slocumb (10) || SkyDome || 27,605 || 35–40 || W4
|- style="text-align:center; background-color:#fbb"
| 76 || June 26 || Tigers || 6–10 || Moehler (5–6) || Eshelman (1–3) || — || Fenway Park || 31,878 || 35–41 || L1
|- style="text-align:center; background-color:#fbb;"
| 77 || June 27 || Tigers || 1–2 (11)|| Miceli (1–1) || Hammond (3–4) || Jones (9) || Fenway Park || 26,753 || 35–42 || L2
|- style="text-align:center; background-color:#fbb;"
| 78 || June 28 || Tigers || 2–9 || Lira (5–4) || Sele (9–6) || — || Fenway Park || 30,886 || 35–43 || L3
|- style="text-align:center; background-color:#bfb;"
| 79 || June 29 || Tigers || 8–6 || Wasdin (3–3) || Bautista (1–2) || Slocumb (11) || Fenway Park || 30,884 || 36–43 || W1
|- style="text-align:center; background-color:#fbb;"
| 80 || June 30 || Marlins || 5–8 || Fernandez (9–6) || Wakefield (3–8) || — || Fenway Park || 27,127 || 36–44 || L1
|-

|- style="text-align:center; background-color:#bfb;"
| 81 || July 1 || Marlins || 9–2 || Eshelman (2–3) || Rapp (4–6) || Corsi (1)|| Fenway Park || 25,538 || 37–44 || W1
|- style="text-align:center; background-color:#fbb"
| 82 || July 2 || Marlins || 2–3 || Brown (8–5) || Gordon (5–7) || Nen (24) || Fenway Park || 31,405 || 37–45 || L1
|- style="text-align:center; background-color:#bfb"
| 83 || July 3 || @ White Sox  || 4–1 || Sele (10–6) || Drabek (6–6) || — || Comiskey Park || 20,521 || 38–45 || W1
|- style="text-align:center; background-color:#fbb"
| 84 || July 4 || @ White Sox  || 5–6 || Hernández (5–1) || Slocumb (0–4) || — || Comiskey Park || 30,007 || 38–46 || L1
|- style="text-align:center; background-color:#fbb;"
| 85 || July 5 || @ White Sox || 8–11 || Darwin (3–6) || Avery (2–2) || — || Comiskey Park || 25,802 || 38–47 || L2
|- style="text-align:center; background-color:#fbb;"
| 86 || July 6 || @ White Sox || 5–6 || Baldwin (6–9) || Wakefield (3–9) || Hernández (20) || Comiskey Park || 25,153 || 38–48 || L3
|- style="text-align:center; background-color:#bfb;"
| 87 || July 10 || Blue Jays || 8–7 (11)|| Eshelman (3–3) || Timlin (2–1) || — || Fenway Park || 30,913 || 39–48 || W1
|- style="text-align:center; background-color:#fbb"
| 88 || July 11 || Blue Jays || 4–8 || Hentgen (9–6) || Wasdin (3–4) || — || Fenway Park || 32,543 || 39–49 || L1
|- style="text-align:center; background-color:#fbb"
| 89 || July 12 || Blue Jays || 1–3 || Clemens (14–3) || Sele (10–7) || Spoljaric (3) || Fenway Park || 33,106 || 39–50 || L2 
|- style="text-align:center; background-color:#fbb"
| 90 || July 13 || Blue Jays || 2–3 || Williams (4–8) || Wakefield (3–10) || Escobar (1) || Fenway Park || 32,418 || 39–51 || L3
|- style="text-align:center; background-color:#bfb"
| 91 || July 14 || Tigers  || 18–4 || Suppan (3–0) || Jarvis (0–2) || — || Fenway Park || 21,997 || 40–51 || W1
|- style="text-align:center; background-color:#fbb"
| 92 || July 15 || Tigers || 5–7 (12)|| Jones (2–3) || Wasdin (3–5) || — || Fenway Park || 25,882 || 40–52 || L1
|- style="text-align:center; background-color:#bfb"
| 93 || July 16 || @ Orioles || 4–1 || Avery (3–2) || Key (12–6) || Slocumb (12) || Camden Yards || 47,712 || 41–52 || W1
|- style="text-align:center; background-color:#bfb"
| 94 || July 17 || @ Orioles || 12–9 || Mahay (1–0) || Orosco (2–2) || Slocumb (13) || Camden Yards || 47,912 || 42–52 || W2
|- style="text-align:center; background-color:#bfb;"
| 95 || July 18 || @ Indians || 7–0 || Wakefield (4–10) || Colón (2–3) || — || Jacobs Field || 43,037 || 43–52 || W3
|- style="text-align:center; background-color:#bfb;"
| 96 || July 19 || @ Indians || 7–10 || Suppan (4–0) || Clark (0–1) || Slocumb (14) || Jacobs Field || 43,070 || 44–52 || W4
|- style="text-align:center; background-color:#fbb;"
| 97 || July 20 || @ Indians || 2–7 || Nagy (10–6) || Gordon (5–8) || — || Jacobs Field || 42,932 || 44–53 || L1
|- style="text-align:center; background-color:#bfb;"
| 98 || July 21 || @ Indians || 3–1 || Avery (4–2) || Wright (2–1) || Slocumb (15) || Jacobs Field || 42,851 || 45–53 || W1
|- style="text-align:center; background-color:#bfb;"
| 99 || July 22 || Athletics || 4–3 || Henry (3–2) || Groom (1–2) || Slocumb (16) || Fenway Park || 27,864 || 46–53 || W2
|- style="text-align:center; background-color:#fbb"
| 100 || July 23 || Athletics || 2–5 || Wengert (5–9) || Wakefield (4–11) || Taylor (18) || Fenway Park || 29,213 || 46–54 || L1
|- style="text-align:center; background-color:#bfb"
| 101 || July 24 || Athletics || 3–0 || Suppan (5–0) || Rigby (0–4) || Slocumb (17) || Fenway Park || 29,312 || 47–54 || W1
|- style="text-align:center; background-color:#fbb"
| 102 || July 25 (1)|| Angels || 4–5 || Finley (9–6) || Gordon (5–9) || — || Fenway Park || 20,427 || 47–55 || L1
|- style="text-align:center; background-color:#fbb"
| 103 || July 25 (2)|| Angels || 5–8 || Holtz (3–2) || Wakefield (4–12) || Percival (14) || Fenway Park || 24,631 || 47–56 || L2
|- style="text-align:center; background-color:#bfb"
| 104 || July 26 || Angels || 7–6 || Henry (4–2) || Percival (4–5) || — || Fenway Park  || 32,148 || 48–56 || W1
|- style="text-align:center; background-color:#bfb"
| 105 || July 27 || Angels || 6–5 || Mahay (2–0) || James (4–3) || — || Fenway Park || 28,454 || 49–56 || W2
|- style="text-align:center; background-color:#bfb"
| 106 || July 29 || @ Mariners || 4–0 || Wakefield (5–12) || Johnson (14–3) || — || Kingdome || 33,293 || 50–56 || W3
|- style="text-align:center; background-color:#bfb"
| 107 || July 30 || @ Mariners || 8–7 (10)|| Jim Corsi (2–1) || Hurtado (1–2) || — || Kingdome || 33,056 || 51–56 || W4
|- style="text-align:center; background-color:#fbb"
| 108 || July 31 || @ Royals || 2–3 (10)|| Carrasco (2–3) || Slocumb (0–5) || — || Kauffman Stadium || 20,544 || 51–57 || L1
|-

|- style="text-align:center; background-color:#bfb"
| 109 || August 1 || @ Royals || 10–3 || Avery (5–2) || Rosado (7–8) || — || Kauffman Stadium || 20,060 || 52–57 || W1
|- style="text-align:center; background-color:#fbb"
| 110 || August 2 || @ Royals || 3–10 || Belcher (11–9) || Sele (10–8) || — || Kauffman Stadium || 19,701 || 52–58 || L1
|- style="text-align:center; background-color:#fbb"
| 111 || August 3 || @ Royals || 2–5 || Bones (2–4) || Wakefield (5–13) || Montgomery (6) || Kauffman Stadium || 17,649 || 52–59 || L2
|- style="text-align:center; background-color:#bfb"
| 112 || August 4 || @ Rangers || 11–5 || Henry (5–2) || Patterson (7–5) || — || The Ballpark at Arlington || 29,601 || 53–59 || W1
|- style="text-align:center; background-color:#bfb;"
| 113 || August 5 || @ Rangers || 13–1 || Gordon (6–9) || Alberro (0–3) || — || The Ballpark at Arlington || 36,289 || 54–59 || W2
|- style="text-align:center; background-color:#bfb;"
| 114 || August 6 || @ Twins || 5–2 || Wakefield (6–13) || Robertson (7–10) || Henry (5) || Metrodome || 12,450 || 55–59 || W3
|- style="text-align:center; background-color:#bfb;"
| 115 || August 7 || @ Twins || 7–6 || Sele (11–8) || Bowers (0–1) || Corsi (2) || Metrodome || 11,899 || 56–59 || W4
|- style="text-align:center; background-color:#bfb;"
| 116 || August 8 || Royals || 8–2 || Avery (6–2) || Bones (2–5) || — || Fenway Park || 31,777 || 57–59 || W5
|- style="text-align:center; background-color:#fbb;"
| 117 || August 9 || Royals || 2–9 || Rusch (4–8) || Suppan (5–1) || — || Fenway Park || 31,410 || 57–60 || L1
|- style="text-align:center; background-color:#bfb;"
| 118 || August 10 || Royals || 6–4 || Corsi (3–1) || Carrasco (2–4) || — || Fenway Park || 27,743 || 58–60 || W1
|- style="text-align:center; background-color:#fbb;"
| 119 || August 11 || Rangers || 3–8 || Oliver (9–10) || Wakefield (6–14) || — || Fenway Park || 28,640 || 58–61 || L1
|- style="text-align:center; background-color:#fbb;"
| 120 || August 12 || Rangers || 2–12 || Witt (11–8) || Sele (11–9) || — || Fenway Park || 26,213 || 58–62 || L2
|- style="text-align:center; background-color:#fbb;"
| 121 || August 13 || Rangers || 6–7 || Sturtze (1–0) || Avery (6–3) || Wetteland (26) || Fenway Park || 24,522 || 58–63 || L3
|- style="text-align:center; background-color:#bfb"
| 122 || August 14 || Twins || 6–1 || Suppan (6–1) || Radke (16–7) || — || Fenway Park || 31,207 || 59–63 || W1
|- style="text-align:center; background-color:#bfb"
| 123 || August 15 || Twins || 5–4 (10)|| Lacy (1–1) || Guardado (4–4) || — || Fenway Park || 25,328 || 60–63 || W2
|- style="text-align:center; background-color:#bfb"
| 124 || August 16 || Twins || 12–4 || Wakefield (7–14) || Bowers (0–3) || — || Fenway Park || 30,011 || 61–63 || W3
|- style="text-align:center; background-color:#bfb"
| 125 || August 17 || Twins || 10–5 || Sele (12–9) || Tewksbury (4–9) || — || Fenway Park || 30,387 || 62–63 || W4
|- style="text-align:center; background-color:#bbb"
| — || August 19 || @ Athletics  || colspan=8|Postponed (rain). Makeup date August 20.
|- style="text-align:center; background-color:#bfb"
| 126 || August 20 (1)|| @ Athletics || 7–5 || Wakefield (8–14) || Haynes (1–3) || Henry (6) || Oakland-Alameda County Coliseum || — || 63–63 || W5
|- style="text-align:center; background-color:#bfb"
| 127 || August 20 (2)|| @ Athletics || 5–4 (13)|| Hudson (2–0) || Wengert (5–10) || Gordon (1) || Oakland-Alameda County Coliseum || 11,382 || 64–63 || W6
|- style="text-align:center; background-color:#fbb"
| 128 || August 21 || @ Athletics || 6–13 || Lorraine (2–0) || Avery (6–4) || — || Oakland-Alameda County Coliseum || 11,570 || 64–64 || L1
|- style="text-align:center; background-color:#fbb;"
| 129 || August 22 || @ Angels || 5–8 || Watson (11–7) || Saberhagen (0–1) || Percival (21) || Anaheim Stadium || 24,977 || 64–65 || L2
|- style="text-align:center; background-color:#fbb;"
| 130 || August 23 || @ Angels || 1–6 || Dickson (13–5) || Sele (12–10) || — || Anaheim Stadium || 20,944 || 64–66 || L3
|- style="text-align:center; background-color:#bfb;"
| 131 || August 24 || @ Angels || 3–2 || Wakefield (9–14) || Hill (6–11) || Gordon (2) || Anaheim Stadium || 20,733 || 65–66 || W1
|- style="text-align:center; background-color:#bfb"
| 132 || August 25 || @ Mariners || 9–8 || Hudson (3–0) || Slocumb (0–8) || Gordon (3) || Kingdome || 29,939 || 66–66 || W2
|- style="text-align:center; background-color:#fbb"
| 133 || August 26 || @ Mariners || 2–8 || Moyer (14–4) || Avery (6–5) || — || Kingdome || 32,287 || 66–67 || L1
|- style="text-align:center; background-color:#bfb;"
| 134 || August 27 || @ Mariners || 9–5 || Wasdin (4–5) || Fassero (13–8) || Gordon (4) || Kingdome || 34,633 || 67–67 || W1
|- style="text-align:center; background-color:#fbb;"
| 135 || August 29 || Braves || 1–9 || Smoltz (13–10) || Sele (12–11) || — || Fenway Park || 32,577 || 67–68 || L1
|- style="text-align:center; background-color:#fbb;"
| 136 || August 30 || Braves || 2–15 || Millwood (3–3) || Wakefield (9–15) || — || Fenway Park || 32,865 || 67–69 || L2
|- style="text-align:center; background-color:#fbb;"
| 137 || August 31 || Braves || 3–7 || Glavine (12–6) || Avery (6–6) || — || Fenway Park || 33,147 || 67–70 || L3
|-

|- style="text-align:center; background-color:#fbb;"
| 138 || September 1 || @ Expos || 2–4 (10)|| Urbina (4–8) || Hudson (3–1) || — || Olympic Stadium || 29,024 || 67–71 || L4
|- style="text-align:center; background-color:#fbb;"
| 139 || September 2 || @ Expos || 5–6 || DeHart (1–1) || Brandenburg (0–2) || Urbina (24) || Olympic Stadium || 12,538 || 67–72 || L5
|- style="text-align:center; background-color:#fbb;"
| 140 || September 3 || @ Expos || 1–0 || Pérez (12–10) || Sele (12–12) || — || Olympic Stadium || 11,509 || 67–73 || L6
|- style="text-align:center; background-color:#fbb;"
| 141 || September 5 || Brewers || 1–7 || Eldred (12–12) || Suppan (6–2) || — || Fenway Park || 27,522 || 67–74 || L7
|- style="text-align:center; background-color:#bfb;"
| 142 || September 6 || Brewers || 10–2 || Wakefield (10–15) || Harnisch (0–2) || — || Fenway Park || 28,686 || 68–74 || W1
|- style="text-align:center; background-color:#bfb"
| 143 || September 7 || Brewers || 11–2 || Henry (6–2) || D'Amico (8–5) || — || Fenway Park || 27,731 || 69–74 || W2
|- style="text-align:center; background-color:#fbb"
| 144 || September 9 || Yankees || 6–8 || Banks (1–0) || Lowe (2–5) || Rivera (41) || Fenway Park || 32,355 || 69–75 || L1
|- style="text-align:center; background-color:#bfb"
| 145 || September 10 || Yankees || 5–2 || Sele (13–12) || Wells (14–10) || Gordon (5) || Fenway Park || 31,011 || 70–75 || W1
|- style="text-align:center; background-color:#bfb"
| 146 || September 12 || @ Brewers || 4–2 || Suppan (7–2) || D'Amico (8–6) || Gordon (6) || Milwaukee County Stadium || 22,079 || 71–75 || W2
|- style="text-align:center; background-color:#bfb"
| 147 || September 13 || @ Brewers || 2–1 || Wakefield (11–15) || Karl (10–12) || Gordon (7) || Milwaukee County Stadium || 22,288 || 72–75 || W3
|- style="text-align:center; background-color:#bfb"
| 148 || September 14 || @ Brewers || 2–1 || Henry (7–2) || Mercedes (6–10) || Gordon (8) || Milwaukee County Stadium || 28,633 || 73–75 || W4
|- style="text-align:center; background-color:#fbb"
| 149 || September 15 || @ Yankees || 6–7 || Rivera (5–4) || Corsi (3–2) || — || Yankee Stadium || 25,873 || 73–76 || L1
|- style="text-align:center; background-color:#fbb"
| 150 || September 16 (1)|| @ Yankees || 0–2 || Pettitte (18–7) || Wasdin (4–6) || Rivera (42) || Yankee Stadium || — || 73–77 || L2
|- style="text-align:center; background-color:#fbb"
| 151 || September 16 (2)|| @ Yankees  || 3–4 || Banks (2–0) || Checo (0–1) || Rivera (43) || Yankee Stadium || 29,145 || 73–78 || L3
|- style="text-align:center; background-color:#bfb;"
| 152 || September 17 || Blue Jays  || 4–3 || Mahay (3–0) || Quantrill (6–7) || Gordon (9) || Fenway Park || 23,648 || 74–78 || W1
|- style="text-align:center; background-color:#bfb;"
| 153 || September 18 || Blue Jays || 3–2 || Corsi (4–2) || Escobar (3–2) || — || Fenway Park || 27,990 || 75–78 || W2 
|- style="text-align:center; background-color:#fbb;"
| 154 || September 19 || White Sox || 4–5 || Foulke (4–5) || Lowe (2–6) || Castillo (3) || Fenway Park || 27,647 || 75–79 || L1 
|- style="text-align:center; background-color:#fbb;"
| 155 || September 20 || White Sox  || 4–6 || McElroy (1–3) || Avery (6–7)  || Castillo (4) || Fenway Park || 30,549 || 75–80 || L2
|- style="text-align:center; background-color:#bfb;"
| 156 || September 21 || White Sox  || 5–2 || Corsi (5–2) || Fordham (0–1) || Gordon (10) || Fenway Park || 27,229 || 76–80 || W1
|- style="text-align:center; background-color:#fbb;"
| 157 || September 23 || @ Tigers  || 0–6 || Keagle (3–4) || Suppan (7–3) || — || Tiger Stadium || 43,039 || 76–81 || L1
|- style="text-align:center; background-color:#bfb"
| 158 || September 24 || @ Tigers || 9–2 || Wakefield (12–15) || Blair (16–8) || — || Tiger Stadium || 10,067 || 77–81 || W1
|- style="text-align:center; background-color:#bfb"
| 159 || September 25 || @ Tigers || 3–1 || Checo (1–1) || Sanders (6–14) || Gordon (11) || Tiger Stadium || 14,495 || 78–81 || W2
|- style="text-align:center; background-color:#fbb"
| 160 || September 26 || @ Blue Jays || 0–3 || Williams (9–14) || Henry (7–3) || — || SkyDome || 34,155 || 78–82 || L1
|- style="text-align:center; background-color:#fbb"
| 161 || September 27 || @ Blue Jays || 5–12 || Janzen (2–1) || Corsi (5–3) || — || SkyDome || 37,401 || 78–83 || L2
|- style="text-align:center; background-color:#fbb"
| 162 || September 28 || @ Blue Jays || 2–3 || Plesac (2–4) || Gordon (6–10) || — || SkyDome || 40,251 || 78–84 || L3
|-

|Reference:

Awards and honors 
 Nomar Garciaparra – Silver Slugger Award (SS), American League Rookie of the Year

All-Star Game
 Nomar Garciaparra, reserve SS

Farm system 

This was the first season that the Red Sox fielded their own team in the Dominican Summer League.

Source:

References

External links
 1997 Boston Red Sox team page at Baseball Reference
 1997 Boston Red Sox season at baseball-almanac.com

Boston Red Sox seasons
Boston Red Sox
Boston Red Sox
Red Sox